Cramahe or Cramahé may refer to:

Hector Theophilus de Cramahé (1720-1788), Lieutenant-Governor of the Province of Quebec
Hector François Chataigner de Cramahé, French military officer and father of Hector Theophilus
Cramahe, Ontario, a Canadian township